Newcastle (also New Castle) is an unincorporated community and census-designated place (CDP) in southwestern Iron County, Utah, United States. Newcastle has a post office with the ZIP code of 84756. The population was 247 at the 2010 census. Newcastle was founded in 1910 by citizens of the more isolated Pinto.

The predominant religion is the Church of Jesus Christ of Latter-day Saints, which church's members settled the area.

Newcastle is a small farming community which has a dairy, orchard, greenhouses producing house plants and tomatoes, and several fields. Crops produced include wheat, oats, alfalfa, corn and potatoes.

Demographics
The 2010 census reported 247 people and 92 housing units in the CDP. The 2010 census reported racial makeup was 88.7% White, 0.4% American Indian and Alaska Native, and 10.9% other races. Hispanic or Latino heritage comprised 19.0% of the population.

Climate
According to the Köppen Climate Classification system, Newcastle has a semi-arid climate, abbreviated "BSk" on climate maps.

See also

 List of census-designated places in Utah

References

External links

Census-designated places in Utah
Census-designated places in Iron County, Utah